Yan Song is a Chinese former professional footballer who played as a midfielder.

He began his senior career with Dalian Shide F.C. where he won several Chinese league titles before he was called up to represent the Chinese senior team and help guide them to a runners-up spot in the 2004 AFC Asian Cup. He also played for Hangzhou Greentown, Jeju United FC, Shanghai Shenhua and Dalian Transcendence.

Club career
Yan Song started his professional football career with Dalian Shide F.C. in the 1999 league season and made an immediate impact in establishing himself within the team by playing in twenty league games and scoring four goals. The following season under a new manager in Milorad Kosanović Yan's career within the club thrived; he went on to win his first league title with the club. Over the next several seasons Yan continued to establish himself as the team's attacking left-winger, winning four league championships and twice winning the Chinese FA Cup with Dalian Shide overall.

Yan Song transferred to Zhejiang Lücheng at the beginning of the 2008 Chinese Super League season where he established himself as a regular playing in twenty-six league games and scoring four goals.

In February 2010 Yan moved to South Korea to join K-League club Jeju United, becoming the fourth Chinese footballer in K-League history. The move itself turned out to be a personal disaster, while Jeju United had a relatively successfully season Yan was completely dropped from the squad and the manager Park Kyung-Hoon only played in one Korean FA Cup. The following season Yan returned to Dalian Shide at the beginning of the 2011 league season, however his return was not very successful and he only made a handful of games before he moved to top-tier club Shanghai Shenhua halfway through the 2012 league season.

In February 2014, Yan transferred to Dalian Transcendence.

International career
Yan Song made his international debut on 12 December 2002 when the Head coach Arie Haan included him in the starting line-up against Bahrain in a friendly game that ended in a 2–2 draw. He was called into the national team throughout 2004 playing in several Fifa world cup qualifiers and AFC Asian Cup squads. Since 2007 he has lost his position within the national team to Mao Jianqing and Du Zhenyu preferred within the subsequent squads.

Honours

Club
Dalian Shide
Chinese Jia-A League / Chinese Super League: 2000, 2001, 2002, 2005
Chinese FA Cup: 2001, 2005

Country
AFC Asian Cup: 2004 (Runners-up)

References

External links

 

1981 births
Living people
Chinese footballers
Footballers from Dalian
China international footballers
Dalian Shide F.C. players
Zhejiang Professional F.C. players
Shanghai Shenhua F.C. players
Dalian Transcendence F.C. players
Association football wingers
Jeju United FC players
Chinese Super League players
K League 1 players
Expatriate footballers in South Korea
Chinese expatriate footballers
Chinese expatriate sportspeople in South Korea
2004 AFC Asian Cup players
Footballers at the 2002 Asian Games
Asian Games competitors for China